The following lists events that happened during 1978 in Cambodia.

Incumbents 
 Chairman of the State Presidium: Khieu Samphan 
 General Secretary of the Communist Party of Kampuchea: Pol Pot

Events

January

February

March

April

May

June

July

August

September

October

November

December

References

 
1970s in Cambodia
Years of the 20th century in Cambodia
Cambodia
Cambodia